City Gate, Chittagong is a gate located in Chittagong. It is a symbol of city area and welcomes every visitor to the city. It connects Chittagong City with Sitakunda Upazila to the north. Colonel Hat area is next to the gate. There are some real state building located in the area. Local police set up a checkpost near city gate area. They used to search civilians while entering to city. Recently, the panel mayor took some steps to beautify the City gate area.

References 

Gates
Monuments and memorials in Bangladesh
Buildings and structures in Chittagong
Place names
Historical regions